Lawrenceburg is the name of several places in the United States of America:

Lawrenceburg, Indiana
Lawrenceburg, Kentucky
Lawrenceburg, Missouri
Lawrenceburg, Tennessee
Lawrenceburg, Pennsylvania, a village of Parker, Pennsylvania

See also
Lawrenceville (disambiguation)